Geronimus may refer to:

Arline Geronimus, American public health researcher
Yakov Lazarevich Geronimus (1898-1984), a Russian mathematician known for contributions to theoretical mechanics and the study of orthogonal polynomials
Yuri Veniaminovich Geronimus (Юрий Венеаминович Геронимус) (1923-2013), a Russian mathematician, who worked on the book Gradshteyn and Ryzhik in the 1960s and early 1970s

See also
Geronimo (disambiguation)
Hieronymus (disambiguation)
Jerome (disambiguation)
Jerónimo (disambiguation)
Saint Jerome (disambiguation)
San Geronimo (disambiguation)
San Jerónimo (disambiguation)